Winterstein may refer to:

People with surname
 Antonio Winterstein (born 1988), professional rugby league footballer for the North Queensland Cowboys of the NRL
 Claudia Winterstein (born 1950), German politician
 Eduard von Winterstein (1871–1961), Austrian film actor
 Frank Winterstein (born 1986) Australian-Samoan professional rugby union footballer
 Taylor Winterstein (born 1989), Australian-Samoan online influencer
 Willy Winterstein (1895–1965), Austrian cinematographer
 Hedwig Pauly-Winterstein (1866–1965), German stage and film actress
 Baroness Elisabeth of Wangenheim-Winterstein (1912–2010), wife of Charles Augustus, Hereditary Grand Duke of Saxe-Weimar-Eisenach

Geography 
 Winterstein (Saxon Switzerland), an isolated, elongated rock massif in the hinterland of Saxon Switzerland in East Germany
 Winterstein (Taunus), a prominent hill spur in the Taunus mountain of Germany